The 1990 PGA Tour of Australia was a series of men's professional golf events played mainly in Australia and New Zealand.

Schedule
The following table lists official events during the 1990 season.

Notes

References

External links

PGA Tour of Australasia
Australasia
PGA Tour of Australasia
PGA Tour of Australasia